"Rhythm of My Heart" is a song written by Marc Jordan and John Capek that Dutch rock and roll artist René Shuman included on his 1986 debut album, René Shuman. In 1991, British singer Rod Stewart recorded the song for his album Vagabond Heart with production by Trevor Horn. It is the album's opening track and was released as its first single on 4 March 1991.

Stewart's version reached  3 on the UK Singles Chart, No. 5 on the US Billboard Hot 100, and No. 1 on the Canadian and Irish charts. The melody is an adaptation of "Loch Lomond". The meter, stanzas and lyrics are also based on the poem, a nod to Stewart's own Scottish heritage. Eric Rigler played the Great Highland bagpipes heard during Stewart's version.

Track listings

Charts

Weekly charts

Year-end charts

Certifications

Covers

"Rhythm of My Heart" was also covered by Runrig, who released it as a single in 1996. This is the version heard on the Loch Ness soundtrack when it was released on CD in 2005, instead of Stewart's version heard in the movie. A live version of the song from his 2013 performance at The Troubadour, West Hollywood was included on the deluxe edition of the album Time. Amy Macdonald and Stewart performed the song (with adjusted lyrics) at the opening ceremony of the 2014 Commonwealth Games in Glasgow.

In popular culture
Stewart's version of the song was used during the closing credits of the 1996 family movie Loch Ness. The single was also played during the bar scenes in the 2000 film The Perfect Storm, scenes that are set several months after Stewart's song was released (October 1991) so the song gives a time-period context. The song is used by Australian A-League football team Sydney FC by the club's active supporter group The Cove at the 23rd minute of games to remember the Cove members who have died. "Rhythm of My Heart" was played at the British farewell ceremony in Hong Kong in 1997.

References

1986 songs
1991 singles
Cashbox number-one singles
Irish Singles Chart number-one singles
Rod Stewart songs
RPM Top Singles number-one singles
Songs written by John Capek
Songs written by Marc Jordan